Ambulyx cyclasticta is a species of moth of the  family Sphingidae.

Distribution 
It is known from Thailand and Burma.

Description

References

Ambulyx
Moths described in 1919
Moths of Asia